The Duchess of Aosta is the wife of the Duke of Aosta, a title created by  Frederick II, Holy Roman Emperor in the 13th century. The Duchy of Aosta had already been ruled by the House of Savoy for some time; it is a corner of the Italian Alps now bordering France and Switzerland, essentially the same as the Aosta Valley.  The title of duke tended to be given to the second son of the ruler, reverting to the head of the house, until Amadeo I of Spain (1845 – 1890), the first and only King of Spain from the House of Savoy. He was the second son of King Vittorio Emanuele II of Italy and was known for most of his life as the Duke of Aosta.  He was elected by the Spanish parliament (the Cortes) as King of Spain in 1870, but abdicated in 1873.  He created a new Aosta branch of the House of Savoy, which retains the title, although it is not legally recognised.  

The duchesses have in recent centuries been royal or princely.  In 2021 the duchess was Princess Olga of Greece, younger daughter of Prince Michael of Greece and Denmark.

 
Aosta, Duchess
Aosta
Aosta
Titles
1789 establishments in Italy